Olaide Olaogun  or Olaide Omolola Olaogun Emmanuel  (born July 9, 1986) is a Nigerian film actor and model. She was a former Lux ambassador.

Background and education
Olaogun was born in Lagos on 9 July 1986. She had supportive parents and she attended African Church Model College. She went on to graduate in English at the University of Lagos.

Career 
She came to notice in Nigeria and Ghana was when she appeared presenting "Soul Sisters" by Wale Adenuga for TV and she was also in the Yoruba series Super Story. She took over the role from Genevieve Nnaji to be a face of Lux in their advertising campaigns in 2007 and continued in this role until 2009. She was also an ambassador for Diva hair extension, Fuman juice and United Bank for Africa (UBA).

Private life
She married Babatunde Ojora Emmanuel  and they had a child in 2016.

Filmography

See also 

 List of Yoruba people
 List of Nigerian actresses

References 

1986 births
Living people
Actresses from Lagos
Nigerian film actresses
21st-century Nigerian actresses
Yoruba actresses
Yoruba female models
Models from Lagos
Actresses in Yoruba cinema
University of Lagos alumni
Nigerian television actresses
Nigerian models
Nigerian female models
Nigerian television presenters